Solomon Glacier is a glacier on the south side of Fisher Bastion which flows west from Solomon Saddle to enter Potter Glacier in the Royal Society Range, Victoria Land. Named by Advisory Committee on Antarctic Names (US-ACAN) in 1994 after Susan Solomon, NOAA, atmospheric chemist who has been a leader in the study of upper atmospheric physics in Antarctica. At the time of naming, Chairman of the Office of Polar Programs Advisory Committee, National Science Foundation (NSF).

See also
 Solomon Saddle
 Ozone hole

Glaciers of Scott Coast